In algebraic geometry, Horrocks bundles are certain indecomposable rank 3 vector bundles (locally free sheaves) on 5-dimensional projective space, found by .

References

Algebraic geometry
Vector bundles